The Djankun are an Aboriginal Australian people of Far North Queensland.

Country
According to Norman Tindale, the Djankun had  of tribal territory in what is now the state of Queensland. The northern limits were around Mount Mulligan and Thornborough, while to the south, they ran to Almaden. Their western frontier was around Mungana while the eastern extension ran to Dimbulah near the headwaters of the Walsh River.

Alternative names
 Ngaikungu.
 Dyangun.
 Chungki.
 Dyangunbari.
 Djandnandi.
 Chunkunburra.
 Chunkunberry, Changunberries.
 Shanganburra.
 Kokotjangun. (Kuku Yalanji exonym)
 Kokomutju.  (northern tribal exonym)
 Mutju.
 Ngaikungo, Ngaikungo-i.

Notes

Citations

Sources

Aboriginal peoples of Queensland